Sir W G Armstrong Whitworth & Co Ltd was a major British manufacturing company of the early years of the 20th century. With headquarters in Elswick, Newcastle upon Tyne, Armstrong Whitworth built armaments, ships, locomotives, automobiles and aircraft.

The company was founded by William Armstrong in 1847, becoming Armstrong Mitchell and then Armstrong Whitworth through mergers. In 1927, it merged with Vickers Limited to form Vickers-Armstrongs, with its automobile and aircraft interests purchased by J D Siddeley.

History
In 1847, the engineer William George Armstrong founded the Elswick works at Newcastle, to produce hydraulic machinery, cranes and bridges, soon to be followed by artillery, notably the Armstrong breech-loading gun, with which the British Army was re-equipped after the Crimean War. In 1882, it merged with the shipbuilding firm of Charles Mitchell to form Armstrong Mitchell & Company and at the time its works extended for over a mile (about 2 km) along the bank of the River Tyne.
Armstrong Mitchell merged again with the engineering firm of Joseph Whitworth in 1897. The company expanded into the manufacture of cars and trucks in 1902, and created an "aerial department" in 1913, which became the Armstrong Whitworth Aircraft subsidiary in 1920.

In 1927, it merged with Vickers Limited to form Vickers-Armstrongs.

Automobiles 

The Armstrong Whitworth was manufactured from 1904, when the company decided to diversify to compensate for a fall in demand for artillery after the end of the Boer War. It took over construction of the Wilson-Pilcher, designed by Walter Gordon Wilson, and produced cars under the Armstrong Whitworth name until 1919, when the company merged with Siddeley-Deasy and to form Armstrong Siddeley.

The Wilson-Pilcher was an advanced car, originally with a 2.4-litre engine, that had been made in London from 1901 until 1904 when production moved to Newcastle. When Armstrong Whitworth took over production two models were made, a 2.7-litre flat four and a 4.1-litre flat six, the cylinders on both being identical with bore and stroke of 3.75in (95mm). The engines had the flywheel at the front of the engine, and the crankshaft had intermediate bearings between each pair of cylinders. Drive was to the rear wheels via a dual helical epicyclic gears and helical bevel axle. The cars were listed at £735 for the four and £900 for the six. They were still theoretically available until 1907. According to Automotor in 1904, "Even the first Wilson-Pilcher car that made its appearance created quite a sensation in automobile circles at the time on account of its remarkably silent and smooth running, and of the almost total absence of vibration".

The first Armstrong Whitworth car was the 28/36 of 1906 with a water-cooled, four-cylinder side-valve engine of 4.5 litres which unusually had "oversquare" dimensions of  bore and  stroke. Drive was via a four-speed gearbox and shaft to the rear wheels. The 40 was listed at £798 in bare chassis form for supplying to coachbuilders. These large cars were joined in 1909 by the 4.3-litre 18/22 and in 1910 by the 3.7-litre 25, which seems to have shared the same chassis as the 30 and 40.

In 1911, a new small car appeared in the shape of the 2.4-litre 12/14, called the 15.9 in 1911, featuring a monobloc engine with pressure lubrication to the crankshaft bearings. This was joined by four larger cars ranging from the 2.7-litre 15/20 to the 3.7-litre 25.5.

The first six-cylinder model, the 30/50 with 5.1-litre  bore by  stroke engine came in 1912 with the option of electric lighting. This grew to 5.7 litres in 1913.

At the outbreak of war, as well as the 30/50, the range consisted of the 3-litre 17/25 and the 3.8-litre 20/30.

The cars were usually if not always bodied by external coachbuilders and had a reputation for reliability and solid workmanship. The company maintained a London sales outlet at New Bond Street. When Armstrong Whitworth and Vickers merged, Armstrong Whitworth's automotive interests were purchased by J D Siddeley as Armstrong Siddeley, based in Coventry.

An Armstrong Whitworth car is displayed in the Discovery Museum, Newcastle upon Tyne.

Aircraft 

Armstrong Whitworth established an Aerial Department in 1912. This later became the Sir W. G. Armstrong Whitworth Aircraft Company. When Vickers and Armstrong Whitworth merged in 1927 to form Vickers-Armstrongs, Armstrong Whitworth Aircraft was bought out by J. D. Siddeley and became a separate entity.

Armaments 

The Elswick Ordnance Company (sometimes referred to as Elswick Ordnance Works, but usually as "EOC") was originally created in 1859 to separate William Armstrong's armaments business from his other business interests, to avoid a conflict of interest as Armstrong was then Engineer of Rifled Ordnance for the War Office and the company's main customer was the British Government. Armstrong held no financial interest in the company until 1864 when he left Government service, and Elswick Ordnance was reunited with the main Armstrong businesses to form Sir W.G. Armstrong & Company. EOC was then the armaments branch of W.G. Armstrong & Company and later of Armstrong Whitworth.

Elswick Ordnance was a major arms developer before and during World War I. The ordnance and ammunition it manufactured for the British Government were stamped EOC, while guns made for export were usually marked "W.G. Armstrong". The 28 cm howitzer L/10 which played a major role in the Siege of Port Arthur in the Russo-Japanese War was developed by Armstrong.

Locomotives

 
After the Great War, Armstrong Whitworth converted its Scotswood Works to build railway locomotives. From 1919 it rapidly penetrated the locomotive market due to its modern plant. Its two largest contracts were 200 2-8-0s for the Belgian State Railways in 1920 and 327 Black 5 4-6-0s for the LMS in 1935/36.

AW also modified locomotives. In 1926 Palestine Railways sent six of its H class Baldwin 4-6-0 locomotives to AW for conversion into 4-6-2 tank locomotives to work the PR's steeply graded branch between Jaffa and Jerusalem. PR also sent another six H Class Baldwins for their defective steel fireboxes to be replaced with copper ones.

AW's well-equipped works included its own design department and enabled it to build large locomotives, including an order for 30 engines of three types for the modernisation of the South Australian Railways in 1926. These included ten 500 class 4-8-2 locomotives, which were the largest non-articulated locomotives built in Great Britain, and were based on Alco drawings modified by AW and SAR engineers. They were a sensation in Australia. AW went on to build 20 large three-cylinder "Pacific" type locomotives for the Central Argentine Railway (F.C.C.A) in 1930, with Caprotti valve gear and modern boilers. They were the most powerful locomotives on the F.C.C.A.

AW obtained the UK license for Sulzer diesels from 1919, and by the 1930s was building diesel locomotives and railcars. An early example is the Tanfield Railway's 0-4-0 diesel-electric shed pilot, No.2, which was built by AW as works number D22 in 1933. In the same year, the company launched the UK's first mainline diesel locomotive, the 800 bhp "Universal". It was successful in trials, but not repaired after an engine crankcase explosion a year later. A total of 1,464 locomotives were built at Scotswood Works before it was converted back to armaments manufacture in 1937.

Overseas operations
After the end of WWI demand for armaments and naval ships all but evaporated, and Armstrong Whitworth had to look into diversifying its business.

The company built a hydroelectric station at Nymboida, New South Wales, near Grafton, Australia in 1923–1924. This is still in use and is substantially original. In 1925 the company tendered unsuccessfully to construct the South Brisbane-Richmond Gap (on the New-South Wales-Queensland border) section of the last stage of the standard gauge railway linking Sydney and Brisbane. This was a heavily engineered railway which includes a long tunnel under the Richmond Range forming the state border and a spiral just south of the border. AW's tender price was £1,333,940 compared with Queensland Railway's tender price of £1,130,142. In the mid-1920s the company clearly was trying to break into the booming Australian market, but was stymied by a preference for local companies.

Dominion of Newfoundland, an island country then mostly dependent on fishery, had plenty of pulpwood but only one paper mill at Grand Falls-Windsor and one pulp mill at Bishop's Falls, both built in the 1900s. Reid Newfoundland Company owners managed to convince AW to invest in building a second paper mill with a hydro station within 50 kms from it, and a joint venture of Newfoundland Power and Paper Company Ltd. was founded in 1923. After much fighting between Harry Reid and then-PM of the dominion Richard Squires the so-called Humber project (after the Humber River) received support from the local government and loan guarantees both from it and the UK; Squires even campaigned on it, making "Hum on the Humber" his slogan for the 1923 Newfoundland general election.

The company can be credited with helping to create the town of Deer Lake. Between 1922 and 1925, a hydroelectric station was built there. The canal system used by the hydroelectric station helped to expand the forestry operations in the area. Some of the equipment used in the construction of the Panama Canal was shipped to Newfoundland island. Electricity from the project was used to power a new pulp and paper mill in Corner Brook which started its work in 1925.

Overall, AW spent about £5M (equivalent to £ million in ) on the development, which went significantly over the original budget and led to an overdraft, only to witness a consistent decline in newsprint and pulp prices after 1923, which was caused by overexpansion of the Canadian industry and wasn't predicted by either party of the project, both lacking experience in paper trade. Since on a falling paper market longtime players with established customer bases had a clear advantage, shareholders sold their well-working but overleveraged and loss-making business to International Paper & Power Company in 1927. The deal left AW with a loss of £2.8M, and the whole group collapsed.

Shipbuilding

Shipbuilding was the major division of the company. From 1879 to 1880 the predecessor shipbuilding company of Charles Mitchell laid down a cruiser for the Chilean Navy at Low Walker Yard. This vessel was later supplied to Japan as the 'Tsukushi' of 1883; the ship was launched as of Armstrong Mitchell build. Between 1885 and 1918 Armstrong built warships for the Royal Navy, Beiyang Fleet, Imperial Russian Navy, Imperial Japanese Navy, and the United States Navy. Amongst these were HMS Glatton which, due to bodged construction, suffered a magazine explosion in Dover Harbour less than one month after commissioning.

The company built the first polar icebreaker in the world: Yermak was a Russian and later Soviet icebreaker, having a strengthened hull shaped to ride over and crush pack ice.

Mergers and demergers
In 1927, the defence and engineering businesses merged with those of Vickers Limited to create a subsidiary company known as Vickers-Armstrongs. The aircraft and Armstrong Siddeley motors business were bought by J. D. Siddeley and became a separate entity.   Production at the Scotswood Works ended in 1979 and the buildings were demolished in 1982.

Products

Hydraulic engineering installations
The forerunner companies, W. G. Armstrong & Co. and later, from 1883 Sir WG Armstrong Mitchell & Company, were heavily involved in the construction of hydraulic engineering installations.  Notable examples include:
Development of the Hydraulic 'Jigger', and lifting apparatus, some exhibited at the 1851 Great Exhibition at the Crystal Palace, London.
Hydraulic mains system, Limehouse Basin, London, 1850s
Swing Bridge, River Tyne, 1873
 120 ton hydraulic 'Sheer Leg' crane at Elswick Works, for transshipment to vessels.
Tower Bridge, London, 1894
A bascule bridge for the railway spanning over the River Bann, Coleraine, Ulster, Northern Ireland, 1921.
 A series of nine late-19th century 160-ton capacity hydraulic cranes for naval use. These were erected worldwide, in India (Bombay), Italy (La Spezia, Pozzuoli, Taranto and Venice), Liverpool, Malta and two more in Japan. The sole surviving example is undergoing partial restoration at Venice's Arsenale.

Ships 
Between 1880 and 1925 they built a number of warships:

 Arturo Prat/ (筑紫),  Chilean Navy (intended)/ Imperial Japanese Navy, 1880
 /Izumi (和泉),  Chilean Navy/ Imperial Japanese Navy, 1883
 HMCS Protector  gunboat for the South Australian colonial navy, 1884
 Naniwa (浪速),  Imperial Japanese Navy, 1885
 Elswick Cruisers, Zhiyuen Class Protected Cruiser, Protected cruiser: Jingyuan, Protected cruiser: Zhiyuen,  Imperial Chinese Navy, 1887
 HMS Victoria,  battleship built for the Royal Navy, delivered in 1891, she was accidentally rammed and sunk in 1893.
 Castore and Polluce, gunboats for the Italian Navy, 1888.
 Yoshino (吉野),  Imperial Japanese Navy, 1892
 USS New Orleans (CL-22), United States Navy, 1895
 Esmeralda,  Chilean Navy, 1895
 Yashima (八島),  Imperial Japanese Navy, 1896
 Takasago (高砂),  Imperial Japanese Navy, 1897
 O'Higgins,  Chilean Navy, 1897
 Chacabuco,  Chilean Navy, 1898
 Asama (浅間),  Imperial Japanese Navy, 1898
 Tokiwa (常盤),  Imperial Japanese Navy, 1898
 USS Albany (CL-23), United States Navy, 1898
 Yermak (Ермак), Imperial Russian Navy, 1898
 Angara, Imperial Russian Navy, 1899
 HNoMS Norge,  Royal Norwegian Navy, 1899
 HNoMS Eidsvold,  Royal Norwegian Navy, 1899
 Hatsuse (初瀬),  Imperial Japanese Navy, 1899
 Izumo (出雲),  Imperial Japanese Navy, 1899
 Iwate (磐手),  Imperial Japanese Navy, 1900
 Southern Cross, Melanesian Mission Steamer, 1903
 HMS Swiftsure,  Royal Navy, 1903
 Kashima (鹿島),  Imperial Japanese Navy, 1905
 HMS Superb,  Royal Navy, 1907
 Minas Geraes,  Brazilian Navy, 1908
 Bahia,  Brazilian Navy, 1909
 HMS Monarch,  Royal Navy, 1911
 HMS Canada,  Royal Navy, 1913
 HMS Agincourt, battleship built for Ottoman Navy but confiscated by British in July 1914
 HMS Malaya,  Royal Navy, 1915
 HMS Eagle,  Royal Navy, 1918
 ,  Royal Navy, 1925
 Isla de Luzón, Spanish Navy 1886-1887

They built oil tankers, including:

 British Emperor,  British Tanker Company, 1916
 British Endeavour  British Tanker Company, 1927
 British Ensign  British Tanker Company, 1917
 British Isles  British Tanker Company, 1917
 British Princess  British Tanker Company, 1917
 British Progress  British Tanker Company, 1927
 British Sovereign  British Tanker Company, 1917
 San Felix  Eagle Oil and Shipping Company, 1921

Locomotives
Armstrong Whitworth built a few railway locomotives between 1847 and 1868, but it was not until 1919 that the company made a concerted effort to enter the railway market.

Contracts were obtained for the construction and supply of steam and diesel locomotives to railway systems in Britain and overseas, including those detailed in the following table.

Armament

Cannons and other armament were produced by the Elswick Ordnance Company, the armament division of Armstrong Whitworth. An especially notable example is the Armstrong 100-ton gun.

See also

 List of car manufacturers of the United Kingdom

References

Bibliography

 
 Tapper, Oliver (1988). Armstrong Whitworth Aircraft since 1913. London:Putnam. .

External links

Tyne and Wear Archives Service , for records of the company
Armstrong Whitworth diesel locomotives and railcars
Brian Webb: Armstrong Whitworth: A World Diesel Pioneer - list of diesel locos ]
 

 
Defunct motor vehicle manufacturers of England
Former defence companies of the United Kingdom
Defunct shipbuilding companies of the United Kingdom
Defunct manufacturing companies of the United Kingdom
Locomotive manufacturers of the United Kingdom
Engineering companies of the United Kingdom
Vintage vehicles
Manufacturing companies established in 1847
Scotswood
1847 establishments in England
Manufacturing companies disestablished in 1927
1927 disestablishments in England
British companies disestablished in 1927
British companies established in 1874
British Shipbuilders